Martin Lojek (born August 19, 1985) is a Czech ice hockey player currently with SKLH Žďár nad Sázavou of the 2nd Czech Republic Hockey League, the third-tier league in the Czech Republic. He played 5 games in the National Hockey League with the Florida Panthers between 2007 and 2008, though most of his career, which started in 2005, has been in his native Czech Republic. Internationally Lojek played for the Czech national junior team at the 2005 World Junior Championships, where he won a bronze medal.

Playing career

In 2002 Lojek moved to North American and joined the Brampton Battalion of the Ontario Hockey League. He was in his first season with Brampton when the Florida Panthers selected him in the fourth round of the 2003 NHL Entry Draft with the 105th overall pick. He spent two more seasons in the Battalion, totalling only five goals with 42 assists in 191 contests.

Lojek made his pro debut during the 2005–06 season with the ECHL's Florida Everblades (45 games, three goals, 11 assists), later getting promoted to the AHL Rochester Americans (15 games, one goal, one assist).

In 2006–07, Lojek spent most of the season with the Americans (69 games, six goals, 13 assists), earning a three-game callup to the Panthers in February. He scored his first NHL point in his third and final game of the season, an assist in a 5–2 victory over the Phoenix Coyotes. He also logged a plus-3 rating in the game.

Lojek spent the balance of the 2007–08 season in Rochester (72 games, six goals, five assists). He earned a two-game callup near the end of December, registering a minus-1 rating and not impacting the scoresheet in any other way.

From 2008 to 2014 Lojek played in the Czech Extraliga with HC Oceláři Třinec, HC Moeller Pardubice, and Piráti Chomutov.

Career statistics

Regular season and playoffs

International

References

External links
 

1985 births
Living people
Brampton Battalion players
Czech ice hockey defencemen
Florida Everblades players
Florida Panthers draft picks
Florida Panthers players
HC Chrudim players
HC Dynamo Pardubice players
HC Havířov players
HC Oceláři Třinec players
MHC Martin players
Piráti Chomutov players
Rochester Americans players
SK Horácká Slavia Třebíč players
Ice hockey people from Brno
Czech expatriate ice hockey players in Canada
Czech expatriate ice hockey players in the United States